is a railway station in Tosu, Saga Prefecture, Japan. It is operated by JR Kyushu and is on the Nagasaki Main Line.

Lines

Station layout 
The station consists of two side platforms serving two tracks. A small station building of concrete construction serves as a waiting room and houses automatic ticket vending machines. The ticket window became unstaffed in 2015. Access to the opposite side platform is by means of a footbridge.

Adjacent stations

History
On 1 March 1947, the facility was upgraded to a full station and passenger traffic commenced. With the privatization of Japanese National Railways (JNR), the successor of JGR, on 1 April 1987, control of the station passed to JR Kyushu.

In January 2015, JR Kyushu announced that Hizen-Fumoto would become an unstaffed station from 14 March 2015. This was part of a major effort by the company to reduce its operating deficit by ceasing to staff 32 stations in its network.

Passenger statistics
In fiscal 2016, the station was used by an average of 606 passengers daily (boarding passengers only), and it ranked 222nd  among the busiest stations of JR Kyushu.

Environs
There are many homes and factories in the area.
Saga Prefectural Tosu Commercial High School
Kyūshū Ryūkoku Junior College

References

External links 

Hizen-Fumoto (JR Kyushu)

Nagasaki Main Line
Railway stations in Saga Prefecture